Gymnodactylus guttulatus is a species of lizard in the family Phyllodactylidae. It is endemic to Serra do Espinhaço, Brazil.

References

Gymnodactylus
Endemic fauna of Brazil
Reptiles of Brazil
Reptiles described in 1982
Taxa named by Paulo Vanzolini